Antoine Vialon (17 December 1814 – 4 March 1866) was a French draftsman and engraver who became music publisher and composer of vocal music later in his life.

Biographical sketch
After playing music of other composers for a while, he began writing and playing his own music. A meticulous artist with a large number of vocal works for one, two, three or four voices with or without accompaniment, he left behind him a collection of musical pieces in numbered and standard notation, some of which won awards in regional choral competitions. He was one of the first propagators of the Galin-Paris-Chevé system, that he later abandoned in favour of a more practical point of view. He was a steadfast and tireless artist who devoted his whole life to his art.

Works
 Fanfare du charlatan
 3 duos concertants for two violins
 Chœur bouffe, for 3- or 4-part male voice choir à capella
 Danse pour tous, choral quadrille for 3- or 4-part male voice choir
 Souvenirs de l'Orphéon français
 Harmonie el musique chorale en chiffres, œvres dramatiques de Jean-François Lesueur; volume of 25 supplements

References

1814 births
1865 deaths
19th-century classical composers
19th-century French composers
19th-century French male musicians
Choral composers
French draughtsmen
French male classical composers
French Romantic composers